Eurygeniinae is a subfamily of antlike flower beetles in the family Anthicidae. There are about 12 genera and more than 50 described species in Eurygeniinae.

Genera
These 12 genera belong to the subfamily Eurygeniinae:

 Bactrocerus LeConte, 1866
 Duboisius Abdullah, 1961
 Eurygenius LaFerté-Sénectère, 1849
 Leptoremus Casey, 1904
 Mastoremus Casey, 1895
 Neoeurygenius Abdullah, 1963
 Pergetus Casey, 1895
 Qadrius Abdullah, 1964
 Retocomus Casey, 1895
 Rilettius Abdullah, 1964
 Stereopalpus LaFerté-Sénectère, 1846
 Thambopasta Werner, 1974

References

Further reading

 
 
 

Anthicidae
Articles created by Qbugbot